Bannu railway station is an abandoned railway station located in Bannu, Pakistan.

See also
 List of railway stations in Pakistan
 Pakistan Railways

References

External links

Railway stations in Bannu District
Railway stations on Bannu–Tank Branch Line